The squad to represent Wales at the 2006 Commonwealth Games was announced by the Commonwealth Games Council for Wales (CGCW) on 22 February 2006. It consisted of 143 athletes (63 Women and 80 men) competing across 14 sports; 85 fewer than the squad in 2002. The team was not able to improve on their medal tally from the 2002 Commonwealth Games when Wales won 6 Gold, 13 Silver and 12 Bronze medals. The team was captained by Dame Tanni Grey-Thompson.

Medals

Gold
Weightlifting:
Michaela Breeze, Women's 63 kg

Swimming:
David Davies, Men's 1500 m Freestyle

Shooting:
David Phelps, Men's 50 m Rifle Prone

Silver
Athletics:
Julie Crane, Women's High Jump

Boxing:
Kevin Evans

Gymnastics:
David Eaton, Men's Horizontal Bar

Lawn Bowls:
Robert Weale, Men's Singles 
Betty Morgan, Women's Singles

Bronze
Athletics:
Beverley Jones, Women's 100 m EAD T37
Hayley Tullett, Women's 1500 m

Boxing:
James Cree, Light Welterweight 64 kg
Darren Edwards, Featherweight 57 kg
Mohammed Nasir, Light Flyweight 48 kg

Cycling:
Nicole Cooke, Women's Road Race
Geraint Thomas, Men's Points Race

Shooting:
Johanne Brekke, Women's 50 m Rifle Prone
Gruffudd Morgan and David Phelps, Men's 50 m Rifle Prone Pairs

Swimming:
David Davies, Men's 400 m Freestyle
David Roberts (swimmer), Men's 100 m EAD Freestyle

Squad
The Welsh squad for the 2006 Commonwealth Games is as follows:

Athletics

Men 
100 m: Christian Malcolm
200 m: Christian Malcolm
400 m: Gareth Warburton
400 m hurdles: Matt Elias, Rhys Williams.
4 × 400 m relay: Gareth Warburton, Matt Elias, Rhys Williams, Dai Greene, Christian Malcolm
1500 m: James Thie
5000 m: Chris Davies
Long jump: Steven Shalders
Triple jump: Steven Shalders
High jump: Robert Mitchell
Pole vault: Scott Simpson
100 m (Disabled): Neville Bonfield

Women
200 m: Chelsea Foster
400 m: Catherine Murphy
800 m: Hayley Tullett
1500 m: Hayley Tullett, Natalie Lewis
10,000 m: Catherine Dugdale
High jump: Julie Crane
Hammer: Carys Parry, Leslie Brannen, Laura Douglas
Discus: Phillipa Roles
Marathon: Tracey Morris
100 m (Disabled): Beverley Jones
800 m (Disabled): Tanni Grey-Thompson
Shot (Disabled): Julie Hamzah

Badminton
Men's Singles: Richard Vaughan, Martyn Lewis, Matthew Hughes, Jonathan Morgan
Men's Doubles: Martyn Lewis, Matthew Hughes, Jonathan Morgan, James Phillips
Women's Singles: Kelly Morgan
Mixed Doubles: Kelly Morgan, Richard Vaughan

Boxing
48 kg: Mohammed Nasir (originally from Yemen)
51 kg: Christopher Jenkins
54 kg: Kris Jones
57 kg: Darren Edwards
60 kg: Robert Turley
64 kg: Jamie-Lee Alger Rees
69 kg: Aaron Thomas
91 kg: Kevin Evans

Cycling

Men 
Mountain bike cross-country: Steven Roach
Endurance: 20 km scratch: Geraint Thomas, Matt Brammeier, Ross Sander  
Endurance: 40 km scratch: Geraint Thomas, Ross Sander
Endurance: 40 km points: Matt Brammeier 
Endurance: road race: Geraint Thomas, Julian Winn, Dale Appleby, Yanto Barker, Rob Partridge, Steven Roach
Endurance: time trial: Geraint Thomas, Julian Winn

Women
Endurance: 25 km points: Nicole Cooke 
Endurance: road race: Nicole Cooke

Gymnastics

Men 
Artistic: David Eaton

Women
Artistic: Samantha Bayley, Lynnett Lisle, Rhian Pugh, Melaine Roberts, Jessica Gazzi
Rhythmic: Francesca Jones

Lawn Bowls
Men's singles: Robert Weale 
Men's pairs: Jason Greenslade, Neil Rees
Men's triples: Andrew Atwood, Martin Selway, Kevin Wall 
Women's singles: Betty Morgan 
Women's pairs: Shirley King, Gillian Miles 
Women's triples: Anwen Butten, Lisa Forey, Katharine Pearce

Netball
Jamilla Abbott, Rhiannon Ace, Sophie Baxter, Ursula Bowers, Suzanne Drane, Amanda Evans, Sara Hale, Lynda James, Rebecca James, Nicola Lewis, Anna Mayes, Nicola Szehofner

Power Lifting
Gideon Griffiths

Rugby Sevens
Richie Pugh (capt, Ospreys), Rhys Williams (Blues), Rhodri McAtee (Penzance), James Hook (Ospreys), James Merriman (Gloucester), Johnathan Edwards (Scarlets), Rhys Oakley (Dragons), Robin Sowden-Taylor (Blues), Wayne Evans (Blues), Gareth Baber (Dragons), Tal Selley (Scarlets), Jonathan Vaughton (Ospreys).

Shooting

Men 
Skeet: Malcolm Allen, Tony Grove
Trap: Mike Wixey, James Birkett-Evans
10 m air pistol: Ian Harris, Alan Green
25 m centre fire: Steve Pengelly, Alan Green
25 m standard pistol: Steve Pengelly, Alan Green
50 m pistol: Ian Harris
10 m: air rifle: Martyn Blake, John Croydon
50 m rifle 3 positions: Martyn Blake, John Croydon
50 m: rifle prone: Griff Morgan, David Phelps

Women
Trap: Sarah Wixey
10 m air rifle: Jennifer Corish, Sian Corish
50 m rifle 3 positions: Jennifer Corish, Sian Corish
50 m rifle prone: Johanne Brekke, Ceri Dallimore

Open
Full Bore(Queens Prize): Gareth Morris, Alexander Woodward

Squash
Men's singles: David Evans, Alex Gough, Gavin Jones 
Men's doubles: David Evans, Alex Gough 
Women's singles: Tegwen Malik
Mixed Doubles: Tegwen Malik, Gavin Jones

Swimming
Men: David Davies, Thomas Haffield, Owen Morgan, Stuart Manford, David Roberts
Women: Jazmin Carlin, Bethan Coole, Julie Gould, Jemma Lowe, Lowri Tynan, Cari-Fflur Davies, Rhiannon Henry

Table Tennis
Men: Ryan Jenkins, Stephen Jenkins, Adam Robertson, David Buck. 
Women: Bethan Daunton, Siwan Mair Davies, Naomi Owen, Claire Harris, Sara Head

Triathlon
Men: Marc Jenkins
Women: Leanda Cave, Anneliese Heard, Helen Tucker

Weightlifting
Men: Terry Perdue. 
Women: Michaela Breeze, Kate Howard, Natasha Perdue.

See also
 Sport in Wales
 Wales at the Commonwealth Games

References

Nations at the 2006 Commonwealth Games
2006
Commonwealth Games